Topolnica (Serbian Cyrillic: Тополница) is a village in Serbia. It is situated in the Majdanpek municipality, in the Bor District. The nearest town is Donji Milanovac. The village has a Serb ethnic majority and its population numbering 1064 people (2002 census).

Populated places in Bor District